Ephippus or Ephippos may refer to:

 Ephippus of Olynthus, Ancient Greek historian of Alexander the Great
 Ephippus of Athens, Ancient Greek comic poet
 Ephippus (fish), a fish genus